The 1996 West Virginia gubernatorial election took place on November 5, 1996 to elect the Governor of West Virginia. Republican Cecil Underwood, who had previously been the Governor of West Virginia from 1957 to 1961, defeated Democratic State Senator Charlotte Pritt.  Concurrently, the state voted the opposite way federally, choosing Democratic U.S. Presidential nominee, incumbent Bill Clinton over Republican nominee Bob Dole in the Presidential election that year.

Pritt was the first woman to secure the West Virginia gubernatorial nomination of either of the two major political parties. This was the last election in which a Republican was elected Governor of West Virginia until 2020. Former Republican Jim Justice was elected in the 2016 election as a Democrat and later switched back to the Republican Party seven months into his term, making him the first Republican governor since 2001 when Underwood left office.

Democratic primary

Candidates 

 Charlotte Pritt, Former State Senator and Candidate in 1992
 Joe Manchin III, State Senator
 Jim Lees, Attorney
 Larrie Bailey, Former State Treasurer
 Bobbie Edward Myers
 Lyle Sattes
 Bob Henry Baber
 Louis J. Davis
 Frank Rochetti
 Richard E. Moon
 Fred Schell

Republican primary

Candidates 

 Cecil Underwood, Former Governor and nominee for U.S. Senate in 1960
 Jon McBride, Retired Astronaut, Navy Veteran, and Businessman
 David McKinley, Former State Delegate, and Former State Party Chair

Results

References

See also

West Virginia
1996
Gubernatorial